Sandra Gough (born 2 August 1943, in Manchester, Lancashire) is an English actress, best known for her role as Irma Ogden in the soap opera Coronation Street, which she played from 1964 to 1971.

Other roles have included Nellie Dingle in the soap opera Emmerdale in 1995, her second role in the soap as she played Doreen Shuttleworth in 1985. She also starred as the mother of layabout Paul Calf (Steve Coogan) in The Paul & Pauline Calf's Video Diaries, and later Coogan's Run.

Filmography

External links

English television actresses
English soap opera actresses
Actresses from Manchester
1943 births
Living people